Martin Komárek (born 14 October 1984) is a Czech football player who currently plays for Loko Vltavín in the Czech 2. Liga.

External links

Guardian Football

1984 births
Living people
Czech footballers
Czech expatriate footballers
Czech First League players
Kazakhstan Premier League players
SK Sigma Olomouc players
FC Vysočina Jihlava players
Loko Vltavín players
FC Vostok players
FK Senica players
Slovak Super Liga players
Expatriate footballers in Slovakia
Expatriate footballers in Kazakhstan
Czech expatriate sportspeople in Slovakia
Czech expatriate sportspeople in Kazakhstan

Association football defenders
Place of birth missing (living people)